John James Beckley (August 4, 1757 – April 8, 1807) was an American political campaign manager and the first Librarian of the United States Congress, from 1802 to 1807. He is credited with being the first political campaign manager in the United States and for setting the standards for the First Party System.

Early years
Born in London, Beckley's parents sent him at the age of 11 to the Colony of Virginia as an indentured servant. John James Beckley was sold to the mercantile firm of John Norton & Son in response to a request for a scribe by John Clayton, and he arrived in Virginia just before his 12th birthday. Clayton guided Beckley's continuing education, and in working with Clayton, Beckley was introduced to many influential members of the colony. When Clayton died in December 1773, Beckley chose to remain in Virginia rather than return to London.

Contrary to many reports, he was never a student at the College of William and Mary. The Phi Beta Kappa Society had its beginning at the College of William and Mary on December 5, 1776.  Since Beckley was not a student at the college, he was not eligible for membership.  On December 10, 1778, the constitution of the society was broadened to permit the election of non-students, and a few months later, on April 10, 1779, Beckley was elected.  Within a month, as might have been predicted, he was chosen clerk, or secretary.

Career
In June of 1782, Beckley participated in the first election of the city of Richmond, Virginia and was one of the 12 elected councilmen. In 1783, he was elected mayor of Richmond, a role in which he would serve three times. By this time, he had amassed  of rich, unoccupied land in the west, but it was tied up in litigation.  Beckley was a Freemason, and in 1785 participated in a fundraising effort which was responsible for constructing Mason's Hall in Richmond.

James Madison sponsored him as Clerk of the House in 1789. As the first Librarian of Congress he was paid $2 a day.     When the position of Librarian was established on January 26, 1802, President Thomas Jefferson asked his friend and political ally John Beckley—who also was serving as the Clerk of the House of Representatives—to fill the post.  Beckley served concurrently in both positions until his death in 1807. He associated with the radicals (especially fellow immigrants) and became an enthusiastic supporter of the French Revolution. He wrote frequently for Philip Freneau's National Gazette and Benjamin Bache's General Advertiser, becoming known as an articulate exponent of American republicanism.  He used the press energetically to denounce Hamilton and the Federalists as crypto-monarchists whose corruption was subversive of American values.

He was elected to the American Philosophical Society in 1791.

Political activities
By 1792, he had started a propaganda machine for the new Republican party that Jefferson and Madison were forming. Thus, he told Madison in May 1795, "I enclose eight copies of the 'Political Observations.' I brought two dozen from New York and have distributed them all. I expect 50 more in a day or two, and shall scatter them also—they were bought and dispersed in great numbers there, and are eagerly enquired after by numbers here—it will be republished in Boston, Portsmouth, Vermont, and at Richmond." Also in 1792, he brought to light Alexander Hamilton's relationship with James Reynolds and his wife Maria. This led to James Monroe, Congressmen Muhlenberg (PA) and Venable (VA) confronting the Treasury Secretary on December 15, 1792. Hamilton denied any financial wrongdoing but admitted to an affair with the wife Maria and paying hush money to her husband. The Republicans agreed to keep the matter confidential and it did not become public until 1797.

In 1795, he took the lead in denouncing Jay's Treaty and had emerged as the most visible spokesman of the new Republican Party. Writing under the sobriquet of "A Calm Observer," in 1796 he charged that, among other heinous offenses, George Washington had stolen public funds and that he richly deserved impeachment.

In 1796, he managed the Jefferson campaign in Pennsylvania, blanketing the state with agents who passed out 30,000 hand-written tickets, naming all 15 electors (printed tickets were not allowed). Thus, he told one agent, "In a few days a select republican friend from the City will call upon you with a parcel of tickets to be distributed in your County. Any assistance and advice you can furnish him with, as to suitable districts & characters, will I am sure be rendered. He is one of two republican friends, who have undertaken to ride thro' all the middle & lower counties on this business, and bring with them 6 or 8 thousand tickets." Beckley thus became the first American professional campaign manager. Federalists had him removed as House clerk in 1797. His allies in Pennsylvania soon found him a state job and he became even more active in promoting the Jefferson candidacy in 1800. Jefferson rewarded him with his old post of Clerk of the United States House of Representatives; Beckley got the House to add on the title of Librarian of Congress.

Family
Beckley married Maria Prince, the daughter of a retired ship captain, just before Congress moved from New York to Philadelphia, where the two would live from 1791 until 1801.
Their son, Alfred Beckley, was born May 26, 1802. Alfred would go on to found the town of Beckley on the western lands (now in West Virginia), and named it in honor of his father. His home, Wildwood, was listed on the National Register of Historic Places in 1970.

References

External links

1757 births
1807 deaths
Clerks of the United States House of Representatives
Librarians of Congress
College of William & Mary alumni
Mayors of Richmond, Virginia
Librarians from London
Virginia Democratic-Republicans